Tóth (sometimes Tót or Toth) was an older term meaning "Slovak" or "Slavonian", since one of the Hungarian names for both Slovakia and Slavonia (Slavic parts of Kingdom of Hungary) was Tothorszag.

Tót has also been a more general Slavic reference, per toponyms like Tótszerdahely and Tótszentmárton on the southern border of Hungary.

The surname Toth is also a less common German surname (Tod), which is a variation of the German word for 'death'.

People with the surname
Notable people with the name include:
Alex Toth (1928–2006), American cartoonist
Amerigo Tot (1909–1984), Hungarian sculptor born Imre Tóth
Saint Alexis Toth (1853–1909), Slovakian priest of the Russian Orthodox church who served in the United States
Andre DeToth (1913–2002), Hungarian-American filmmaker
Andrea Tóth (born 1980), Hungarian water polo player
Árpád Tóth (1886–1928), Hungarian poet
Béla Tóth (born 1943), Hungarian and Italian chess master
Brett Toth (born 1996), American football player
Claudia Toth Fischer (born 1981), Austrian curler
Ed Toth, American drummer
Eric Justin Toth (born 1982), suspected child pornographer and FBI Ten Most Wanted fugitive
Ferenc Tóth (sport wrestler) (1928–2003), Hungarian Greco-Roman wrestler
Ferenc Tóth (pilot), Hungarian glider aerobatic champion
Gabi Tóth (born 1988), Hungarian singer
Ildikó Tóth (actress) (born 1966), Hungarian actress
George N. Toth (1934-1985) Wild Animal Trainer, Hungary, United States. Motion pictures
Iván Tóth (born 1971), Hungarian retired football goalkeeper
Ivett Tóth (born 1998), Hungarian figure skater
Jennifer Toth (born 1967), English journalist and writer
Jerry Toth (1928–1999), Canadian composer and woodwind player
Jon Toth (born 1994), American football player
Juraj Tóth (born 1975), Slovak astronomer
Kaleb Toth (born 1977), Canadian lacrosse player
Kálmán Tóth (poet) (1831–1891), Hungarian poet
Kevin Toth (born 1967), American shot putter
Laszlo Toth (born 1940), Australian who took a geologist hammer to Michelangelo's Pieta
László Fejes Tóth (1915–2005), Hungarian mathematician
Mihály Tóth II (born 1974), Hungarian footballer
Mike Toth (born 1963), Canadian sports anchor
Noémi Tóth (born 1976), Italian water polo player
Paolo Toth (born 1941), Italian computer scientist and engineer
Peter Toth (born 1940), Brazilian chess master
Peter Wolf Toth (born 1947), American sculptor
Steve Toth (born 1960), American politician
Taylor Toth (born 1988), American figure skater
Tamás Tóth (born 1989), Hungarian triathlete
Tímea Tóth (born 1980), Hungarian handballer
Timea Toth (swimmer) (born 1968), Israeli retired Olympic swimmer
Tom Toth (born 1962), American football player
Viktoria Orsi Toth (born 1990), Italian beach volleyball player
Zsófia Tóth (born 1989), Hungarian triathlete

See also 
 Lazlo Toth (disambiguation)
 Thoth

References 

Hungarian-language surnames
Ethnonymic surnames